Druuna: Morbus Gravis is a 2001 video game, based upon the science fiction and fantasy comic book character of Druuna. The adventure game was developed for Microsoft Windows by Artematica and published by Microïds.

The game has three different modes of play: Arcade/Adventure and 3D real time Interactive full motion video. There are 60 minutes' worth of cinematics in full motion video. Gameplay reveals a CGI rendered industrial world where monsters and enemies and the environment can surprise Druuna in fatal ways.

Reception 

The game received "generally unfavorable reviews" according to the review aggregation website Metacritic.

Notes

References

External links 
 

2001 video games
Adventure games
Microïds games
Science fiction video games
Video games based on comics
Video games developed in Italy
Video games featuring female protagonists
Windows games
Windows-only games